Maarit Raiskio (born 5 February 1964) is a Finnish equestrian. She competed in two events at the 1988 Summer Olympics.

References

External links
 

1964 births
Living people
Finnish female equestrians
Finnish dressage riders
Olympic equestrians of Finland
Equestrians at the 1988 Summer Olympics
Sportspeople from Pori